Qasimiya or the Qasimi order, is a Naqshbandi branch in origin, and is based in a small village called Mohra Sharif located in the Murree hills of Punjab, Pakistan close to the Pakistani capital of Islamabad. It was made into a spiritual center by Baba Ji Muhammad Qasim Sadiq (b. 1263 A.H.), a purported Sufi shaikh or master.

Religious festivals
Twice a year, in the last week of May and November, there are congregations, attended by thousands, held to commemorate Pir Baba Ji Muhammad Qasim Sadiq and his descendants.

References

Naqshbandi order
Sufi shrines